WLMO-LD (channel 2) is a low-powered This TV-affiliated television station in Fort Wayne, Indiana, United States, owned by Metro Video Production. Its studios and control room are located in Lima, Ohio.

Digital channels
The station's digital signal is multiplexed:

References

External links

This TV affiliates
Comet (TV network) affiliates
LX (TV network) affiliates
Low-power television stations in the United States